Emanuel Hegenbarth (14 January 1868, Böhmisch Kamnitz - 18 July 1923, Dresden) was a German painter and graphic artist. Most of his works feature animals.

Life and work 

His initial drawing lessons came from the Czech painter, . In 1884, he began studying at the Academy of Fine Arts, Munich. After two years, his studies were interrupted by illness so, at the request of his father, a glass maker, he switched to a commercial course at a business school in Leipzig. In 1892, he went back to his original interests, at the Academy of Arts, Berlin, then returned to Munich to complete his studies.

Gabriel von Hackl and Carl Marr were his first instructors, but his primary influences came from a class in animal painting taught by Heinrich von Zügel, one of the founders of the Munich Secession. From 1901, he worked as a freelance artist in Munich. In 1902, he married Zügel's eldest daughter, Anna Emilie.

Thanks to his involvement in the artistic community of Dresden, he received an offer to teach at the Academy of Fine Arts there in 1903; taking the position of Professor for their newly established animal painting class. His first students included Kurt Schwitters. His motto was "a visual artist does not speak", and refused to participate in discussions about art.

From 1905 to 1908, he served as a mentor to his young cousin, who became a famous painter and illustrator. 

He died in 1923, at the age of fifty-five, from complications suffered after undergoing surgery for an unspecified chronic health problem.

References

Further reading 
 
 Leben und Werk des Künstlers Emanuel Hegenbarth. Böhmisch-Kamnitz, München, Dresden, exhibition catalog, Heimatverband Krs Tetschen-Bodenbach, Nördlingen/Bayern 1961
 Xaver Schaffer: "Der Maler Emanuel Hegenbarth", In: Stifter-Jahrbuch. #7, 1962, pp. 257–264.
 Elisabeth Feilen: Emanuel Hegenbarth. 1868–1923, with a list of works, compiled by Franz Hegenbarth. Bongers, Recklinghausen 1984, 
 Helmut Götz: Emanuel Hegenbarth. Ausstellung zum 70. Todestag vom 18. Juli bis 15. August 1993 in der Städtischen Kunstsammlung Murrhardt. Bongers, Recklinghausen 1993.

External links 

 
 More works by Hegenbarth @ ArtNet

1868 births
1923 deaths
19th-century German painters
19th-century German male artists
German painters of animals
Academy of Fine Arts, Munich alumni
Academic staff of the Dresden Academy of Fine Arts
People from Ústí nad Labem District
20th-century German painters
20th-century German male artists